Numerous video games were released in 2016.  New hardware came out as well, albeit largely refreshed and updated versions of consoles in the PlayStation 4 Pro, PlayStation 4 Slim, and Xbox One S.  Commercially available virtual reality headsets were released in much greater numbers and at much lower price points than the enthusiast-only virtual reality headsets of earlier generations. Augmented reality also became mainstream with Pokémon Go. Top-rated games originally released in 2016 included Uncharted 4: A Thief's End, Inside, Overwatch, Forza Horizon 3, NBA 2K17, Dark Souls III, and Battlefield 1 and Doom 2016.  The top five highest-grossing video games of 2016 were League of Legends, Honor of Kings/Arena of Valor, Monster Strike, Clash of Clans, and Dungeon Fighter Online.

Top-rated games

Major awards

Critically acclaimed titles
Metacritic (MC) and GameRankings (GR) are aggregators of video game journalism reviews.

Financial performance
Analysis firm SuperData estimated that the global video game software market brought in $91 billion in revenues in 2016; this was an increase over the $74 billion estimated for 2015, but SuperData noted that their 2016 estimates included a larger data set. Of the $91 billion, $41 billion was attributed to mobile gaming, particularly the titles Clash Royale and Pokémon Go, with the largest mobile gaming section in Asia with total revenues near $25 billion. Personal computer video games made up $34 billion, with $19 billion contributed from free-to-play games, and console games, retail and downloadable, were $26 and $6.6 billion, respectively. The firm also identified that virtual reality (VR), professional video game sports, and streaming were still growing markets in the year. DFC Intelligence reported similar numbers for revenues in the various sectors, and noted that mobile gaming revenues overtook both console and personal computer revenues in 2016.

Newzoo estimated that $70.4 billion of video game revenues were made by the top 25 publicly-trading companies, led by Tencent ($10.2B), Sony ($7.9B), Activision Blizzard ($6.6B), Microsoft ($6.5B) and Apple, Inc. ($5.9B). The top ten companies brought in more than 54% of total revenues during 2016, up from 43% in 2015.

IHS Markit estimated that worldwide revenue related to console hardware, software, and services was $34.7 billion, down about 2.5% from 2015; hardware sales were down from $12.8 billion to $10.5 billion, while software and service revenues were up. Sony held about 57% of the market share during 2016, followed by Microsoft and Nintendo.

Within the United States, revenues from the video game industry in 2016 was estimated at $30.4 billion by the Entertainment Software Association and NPD Group, slightly up from 2015's $30.2 billion. Of that, $24.5 billion was spent on video game software, an increase of 6% from 2015. Digital purchases, which included full game purchases, downloadable content, game subscriptions, and mobile game microtransactions, made up 74% of this number, continuing a steady increase of digital sales over retail since 2010. Sales were driven by the introduction of VR, Pokémon Go and Pokémon Sun and Moon, and the games Battlefield 1, Call of Duty: Infinite Warfare, Madden NFL 17, NBA 2K17 and Tom Clancy's The Division.

Highest-grossing games
The following were 2016's top ten highest-grossing video games worldwide in terms of digital revenue (including digital purchases, microtransactions, free-to-play and pay-to-play) across all platforms (including mobile, PC and console platforms). Six of the top ten highest-grossing games are published or owned by Tencent.

Events

Notable deaths

 March 17 – Larry Drake, 66, voice actor known for the voice of Kazdan Paratus in "Star Wars: The Force Unleashed".

Hardware releases
The list of game-related hardware released in 2016 in North America.

Series with new entries
Series with new installments in 2016 include Ace Attorney, Battlefield, Call of Duty, Civilization, Cossacks, Dark Souls, Dead Rising, Deus Ex, Dishonored, Digimon, Doom, Far Cry, FIFA, Final Fantasy, Fire Emblem, Forza Horizon, Gears of War, Hearts of Iron, Hitman, Homefront, Homeworld, Kirby, Mafia, Mario Party, Master of Orion, Metroid, Mirror's Edge, Persona, Plants vs. Zombies: Garden Warfare, Pokémon, Ratchet & Clank, Shadow of the Beast, Shadow Warrior, Sonic the Hedgehog, Star Fox, Star Ocean, Street Fighter, Titanfall, Total War, Uncharted, Watch Dogs, XCOM, and Zero Escape.

In addition, 2016 saw the introduction of several new properties, including Abzû, Hyper Light Drifter, Inside, The Last Guardian, No Man's Sky, Owlboy, Obduction, Overwatch,  Quantum Break, Stardew Valley, Tom Clancy's The Division, and The Witness.

Game releases
The list of games released in 2016 in North America.

January–March

April–June

July–September

October–December

Video game-based film and television releases

Cancelled games

Cancelled
 Batman: Arkham Knight (Mac, Lin)
 EverQuest Next (Win, PS4)
 Fable Legends (Win, XBO)
 Halo Online (Win)
 Hyper Light Drifter (PSVita, Wii U)
 Nosgoth (Win)
 Not a Hero (PSVita)
 Project: Knoxville (XBO)
 Rising Thunder (Win)
 Scribblenauts: Fighting Words (iOS)
 Shantae: Half-Genie Hero (PS3, X360)
 Triad Wars (Win)
 The Walking Dead: Season Three (PS3, X360)
 Unnamed extreme sports game by Criterion Games
 Whore of the Orient (Win, PS4, XBO)
 Yooka-Laylee (Wii U)

Discontinued
 Darkspore (Win)
 Dust 514 (PS3)
 Might & Magic: Duel of Champions (Win)
 PlanetSide (Win)
 Project Spark (Win, X360, XBO)
 The Mighty Quest for Epic Loot (Win)
 Tom Clancy's EndWar Online (Win)
 Tom Clancy's Ghost Recon Phantoms (Win)

See also
2016 in games

References

Notes
 The release date is slated for Japan only.
 A western or worldwide release of previously regional exclusive games.
 These games were targeted to be released in fiscal year 2017, which begins on April 1, 2016, to March 31, 2017.

Footnotes

2016 in video gaming
Video games by year